Jaspinder Cheema (born 12 August 1988 ) is a Punjabi actress and model. She was the winner of Miss PTC Punjabi 2008. She married PTC anchor, Gurjit Singh, on February 19, 2016. She studied theatre at Punjab University Chandigarh.

Filmography 
As Actress

Music videos

Awards and nominations

|-
|2017 
Special recognition award in acting 
|won

References

External links
 

Actresses in Punjabi cinema
Indian film actresses
Female models from Punjab, India
Living people
1989 births